Edie Mirman is an American voice actress that has worked on many feature films, animated films and animated series. Her extensive list includes features from Dreamworks ( Boss Lady from Boss Baby) , How to Train Your Dragon, Madagascar and hundreds of other films . Also known as the voice of Gatomon and Angewomon in the Digimon series. She revoiced hundreds of episodes of series work in the United States and abroad. Also for many animated characters including the voice of Fujiko Mine from Tales of the Wolf, and also for both Miriya Parina Sterling and Nova Satori from Robotech. She has also voiced many characters for Studio Ghibli. She is credited alternately as Penny Sweet and Edie S. Mirman. She is the owner of Edie's Gourmet Looping, specializing in ADR/Looping for Film and Television. Wrote The Dibbledab Tale, It's a Girl Thing, Homer and Althea.

Early life
Mirman was born in New York

Filmography

Anime
 Bio Hunter - Additional Voices
 Casshan: Robot Hunter - Luna
 Crying Freeman - Emu Hino
 Dragon Ball - Launch (Marilynn) (Harmony Gold dub)
 Digimon Adventure - Salamon, Gatomon, Angewomon
 Digimon Adventure 02 - Salamon, Gatomon, Angewomon, Nefertimon, Silphymon (shared with Neil Kaplan)
 El Hazard: The Magnificent World - Princess Rune Venus
 Grimm's Fairy Tale Classics - Grandmother (Little Red Riding Hood)
 Honeybee Hutch - Honey Queen Bee
 Iczer-One - Girl
 Tales of the Wolf - Fujiko Mine (Streamline version)
 Maple Town - Miss Deer
 Moldiver - TV Reporter
 Nadia: The Secret of Blue Water - Electra (Streamline dub)
 Noozles - Sandy's Grandmother/Mark's Mother
 Orguss 02 - Queen Miran
 Robotech - Miriya Parina Sterling, Nova Satori
 The Big O - Additional Voices
 Trigun - Additional Voices
 Vampire Hunter D - Lamika

Animation
 Dogtanian and the Three Muskehounds - Milady
 The Little Polar Bear - Grandmother, Lemming 3
 Spider-Man - Illyena
 Transformers: Robots in Disguise - Additional Voices
 Willy Fog 2 - Various

Films
 The Angry Birds Movie 2 - Additional Voices
 The SpongeBob Movie: Sponge on the Run - Additional Voices
 Captain Underpants: The First Epic Movie - ADR Group
 Despicable Me - Additional Voices
 Digimon: The Movie - Gatomon, Angewomon, Magnadramon, Recorded Operator
 Digimon: Revenge of Diaboromon - Gatomon, Angewomon
 Epic - Flower Jinn
 Fist of the North Star - Screamer
 The Professional: Golgo 13 - Laura Dawson
 Howl's Moving Castle - Additional Voice
 Kiki's Delivery Service - Barsa, Ursula (Streamline dub)
 Lensman - Clarissa "Chris" MacDougal (Debut role)
 Madagascar: Escape 2 Africa - Telephone Recording
 Mulan - Additional Voices
 Mystery of Mamo - Fujiko Mine (Streamline version)
 Nausicaa of the Valley of the Wind - Additional Voices
 My Neighbor Totoro - Teacher, Old Woman (Streamline dub)
 ParaNorman - Blithe Hollow Townsperson
 Robotech: The Shadow Chronicles - Maia Sterling
 Space Pirate Captain Harlock - Kayla "Kay" Kerry, Headmistress Marano
 The Boss Baby - The Big Boss Baby, ADR Group
 The Hunchback of Notre Dame II - Additional Voices
 The Castle of Cagliostro - Fujiko Mine (Streamline version)
 The Prince of Light - Sita
 The Wind Rises -  Jiro's Mother
 Tron: Legacy - Computer Voice
 Wicked City - Kanako/Spider Woman
 Zeiram - Iria

Live TV Show
 Maleficent
 CSI
 The Mentalist
 Girlfriends' Guide to Divorce
 Night Shift

Music
 Jin Jin - Additional Voices

Video games
 CSI (game series) - Catherine Willows
 Terror T.R.A.X: Track of the Vampire (PC) - Officer Allison Walkin, Ether Voice
 Star Trek: Judgment Rites - Boy, Pupils
 Star Wars: Masters of Teräs Käsi - Arden Lyn, Mara Jade
 Star Wars: X-Wing vs. TIE Fighter'' - Additional Voices

External links

Living people
American television writers
American video game actresses
American voice actresses
American women television writers
People from the Bronx
Screenwriters from New York (state)
Year of birth missing (living people)
21st-century American women